Leonid Vladimirsky (21 September 1920 in Moscow, Russia - 18 April 2015) was a Russian illustrator who worked on fairy tales, including books by Alexander Pushkin (Ruslan and Ludmila), Aleksey Tolstoy (Golden Key, 1953), and Alexander Volkov, as well as some folk tales.

Vladimirsky graduated from Gerasimov Institute of Cinematography but decided to work as a book illustrator. He found it easiest to create evil characters, which are easily derived from the everyday life.

Books illustrated by Vladimirsky sold over 20 million copies. His illustrations to Tolstoy and Volkov were so popular in the Soviet Union that they were commonly reproduced on common goods including bottles of soft drinks and postcards.

References

External links
 vladimirsky.emeraldcity.ru

1920 births
2015 deaths
Russian illustrators
Soviet artists